Steven Shane (Steve) Boxall (born 16 May 1987 in Canterbury, Kent) is a former motorcycle speedway rider. He rode with the Belle Vue Aces in the Elite League.

Career 
Boxall won the Conference League Riders' Championship in 2005. Also in 2005, he won the Premier League Championship with the Rye House Rockets, and he did so again in 2007.

References 

1987 births
Living people
British speedway riders
English motorcycle racers
Sportspeople from Canterbury
Belle Vue Aces riders
Rye House Rockets riders